Elvis da Silva Santana (born 11 July 1983) is a Brazilian footballer who plays as a midfielder.

References

External links

Fotbolltransfers profile

1983 births
Living people
Association football midfielders
Brazilian footballers
Allsvenskan players
Superettan players
Assyriska FF players
AFC Eskilstuna players
Hammarby Talang FF players
Hammarby Fotboll players
Akropolis IF players
Östersunds FK players
Bodens BK players